Hald may refer to:

 Anders Hald (1913–2007), Danish statistician
 Pauline Hald (1904–1998), American clinical chemist
 HAL Daemon, often referred to as "HALD"

See also 
 High authority for the struggle against discrimination and for equality (HALDE)
 Jean-Baptiste Du Halde (1674–1743), French historian